The Brooklyn Symphony Orchestra (BSO) is a symphony orchestra in the New York City metropolitan area. Founded in 1973, the orchestra plays concerts throughout the year at the Brooklyn Museum and other venues in Brooklyn and New York City. The BSO's artistic director is Nicholas Armstrong. Starting with the 2015–2016 season, BSO's assistant conductor was Felipe Tristan, who then was promoted to associate conductor starting on the 2018–2019 season.

The BSO's repertoire spans from the early classics to modern and contemporary works. The Brooklyn Symphony Orchestra rehearses at the Mark Morris Dance Center in downtown Brooklyn.

For 37 years, the BSO performed at Saint Ann's Church in downtown Brooklyn, but in 2014 moved to their current performance space at the Brooklyn Museum. The change was intended to bring classical music to broader audience.

References

External links 

Musical groups from Brooklyn
Culture of Brooklyn
Musical groups established in 1973
Orchestras based in New York City